The Naga Kingdom is the territory of a hardy and warlike tribe called Nagas. They were also considered one of the supernatural races like the Kinnaras.

Etymology 
The word Naga in the Sanskrit language means snake or serpent. It seems likely that the Naga people were a serpent-worshipping group who were later described as serpents themselves in ancient Indian literature.

References in Mahabharata

Mahabharata epic begins with history of Nagas, in astonishing detail, spanning the initial chapters in the first book (Adi Parva). These chapters were distributed into three sub-volumes called Paushya, Pauloma and Astika.

Naga races
 MBh (1,57)

Naga race in north-west India was almost exterminated by Janamejaya, the Kuru king in Arjuna's line, who conducted the massacre of Nagas at Takshasila. This massacre was stopped by Astika, a Brahmin who was son of Manasa the sister of all Nagas and Sage Jaratkaru. The names of the principal Nagas known widely for their achievements, and slain by Janamejaya is mentioned at (1,57). They were described to be belonging to different Naga races:-

 Takshaka's Race  :- Puchchandaka, Mandalaka, Pindasektri, Ravenaka; Uchochikha, Carava, Bhangas, Vilwatejas, Virohana; Sili, Salakara, Muka, Sukumara, Pravepana, Mudgara, Sisuroman, Suroman and Mahahanu. (Takshaka's son Aswasena is mentioned as belonging to the Airavata's race at (8,90). This could mean that Takshaka's race, was a branch of Airavata's race.)

Kauravya's Race  :- Aryaka, Kundala Veni, Veniskandha, Kumarka, Vahuka, Sringavera, Dhurtaka, Pratara and Astaka.
(Kauravya's race is mentioned as a branch of Airavata's race at (1,216).

Dhrutarashtra's Race :- Sankukarna, Pitharaka, Kuthara, Sukhana, and Shechaka; Purnangada, Purnamukha, Prahasa, Shakuni, Dari, Amahatha, Kumathaka, Sushena, Vyaya, Bhairava, Mundavedanga, Pisanga, Udraparaka, Rishabha, Vegavat, Pindaraka; Raktanga, Sarvasaranga, Samriddha, Patha and Vasaka; Varahaka, Viranaka, Suchitra, Chitravegika, Parasara, Tarunaka, Maniskandha and Aruni. (Dhritarashtra was Airavata's younger brother (1,3).)

 Nagas, Pannagas and Uragas

Nagas were mentioned as born of Surasa and Pannagas another Naga race, was mentioned as born of Kadru at (1,66). Pannagas and Nagas were mentioned as separate but related Naga races at (3,85). Pannagas were mentioned to denote Nagas at (3-172,180,289) (7-142) (9,45) (12,47) (13,98) Nagas destroyed by Arjuna at Khadavaprstha is described as Pannagas (5,124). Pannagas and Uragas were mentioned as separate but related races at (6,65). Uragas were mentioned to denote Nagas at (1-1,172) (3-167,179,187,223) (many other references) Uragas and Nagas were mentioned as separate but related Naga races at (3,158) -in Yaksha territory; also at (7-160,198)
At (1,172) is mentioned that Uragas along with Yakshas, Rakshasas, Gandharvas, Pisachas and Danavas as aware of the history of Arya kings.

Prominent Nagas

Naga King Takshaka

Acts of Pandava Arjuna and Naga Takshaka was the cause of enmity between Kuru kings and Nagas. Arjuna killed Takshaka's wife who dwelled in the Khandava Forest. Takshaka killed Parikshit the grandson of Arjuna by poisoning him in league with Shringi. King Janamejaya conducted a massacre of Nagas to avenge his father Parikshit's death. Later a sage named Astika ended this enmity between Kurus and Nagas.

Naga King Nahusha
Nahusha is mentioned as a Naga at (1,35) (5,103).

At (13,99) Nahusha is mentioned as ruling even the Deva territories, and later degraded to the status of a Naga king. It is repeated at (12,342). The history of Nahusha becoming the king of Deva territories is mentioned at (5-11 to 17). He was powerful and renowned. Power corrupted him and he was later banished from the throne of Deva territories. It seems he later lived as a small king of the Naga race. Yayati (a king of Lunar Dynasty) is mentioned as his son at many places in Mahabharata. Thus, it seems, he later became known as a king belonging to the Lunar Dynasty of kings in ancient India.

A snake (a viper) attacked and afflicted Bhima in a forest called Visakhayupa, situated at the source of river Yamuna. This incident is mentioned at (3,176). At (3,178) that snake is described as Nahusha. He is mentioned here as the son of Ayus (Pururavas (first king of Lunar Dynasty) -> Ayus -> Nahusha), thus he becomes a forefather of the Pandavas. This raises a doubt whether the lunar race of kings originally branched from the Naga race of kings. Many kings in the line of Purus and Kurus, all being branches of the lunar race, like Dhritarashtra and Janamejaya also were mentioned as Nagas at various places. Kuru city Hastinapura also is some times mentioned as Nagapura (one of its meaning being the city of Nagas).
 In Book 12 and 13 Nahusha is mentioned as a learned king conversing with many sages like Bhrigu, Chyavana and Agastya

Naga chief Aryaka 
Nagawanshi Aryaka (sansk. आर्यक) was mentioned to be a member of Naga king Vasuki's palace. He was described as related to Pandava Bhima. He was the grandfather of the father of Kunti, the mother of Bhima. He recognized Bhima as his kinsmen when the Nagas rescued Bhima, a boy then, and brought him to the palace of Vasuki. Bhima was food-poisoned, tied up and thrown into river Ganges at a place called Pramanakoti, by Duryodhana (1,128).

Aryaka is mentioned to have born in the race of Kauravya. Kauravya is born in the race of Airavata. Aryaka's son was named Chikura. Chikura was slain by a Suparna. Chikura's wife was the daughter of a Naga named Vamana. Chikura's son was named Sumukha. Matali, the charioteer of Deva king Indra, after wandering several regions of underworld with Narada for bridegroom, chose Sumuka as his daughter Gunakesi's husband (5,103).

Naga Prince Iravan

During a 12-year-long pilgrimage over the whole of India, Arjuna, leaving Indraprastha, arrived at the source of the Ganga (now known as Rishikesh) where it entered the plains. There he met a Naga woman, Ulūpī. She took Arjuna to the mansion of Kauravya, king of the Nagas. Kauravya himself was mentioned as an Airavata. Arjuna spent one night with Ulūpī and came back from the palace of Kauravya to the region where the Ganga enters the plains (1,216).

Ulūpī's former husband was slain by a Suparna and she was childless. A son named Iravan was born to Arjuna and Ulūpī. But Ulūpī's brother hated Arjuna since he destroyed the Nagas dwelling in Khandava forest and so abandoned Ulūpī and his son.

Iravan grew in the territory of Nagas, protected by his mother. Later when Arjuna visited the region to the northeast of the Naga territories, he went and met Arjuna. He accepted him as his beloved son, and asked him to render assistance in battle when required. Iravan entered the Kurukshetra War with an excellent cavalry force driven by Naga warriors (6,91). He participated in the war (6-84,91) and was slain by the Rakshasa Alamvusa, the son of Risyasringa (6,91).

 Ulūpī is mentioned as interacting with Arjuna's another son Vabhruvahana, born of another wife Chitrangada at (14,79).
 Ulūpī and Chitrangada are mentioned as being accepted into the palace of Hastinapura at (14,88)
 Ulūpī and Chitrangada are mentioned with other wives of the Pandavas at (15,1).
 Ulūpī and Chitrangada are mentioned as departing, when Pandavas set for their last journey (17,1).
 A weapon used in Kurukshetra War is named a Naga weapon (8,53).

Other Nagas
 Naga Karkotaka is mentioned as interacting with Nishadha king Nala (3-66,79).
 Vasudeva Krishna is mentioned to end the reign of a Naga (his name was Kaliya as per Bhagavata Purana) in the river Yamuna (4,22).
 A Naga named Renuka is mentioned at (13,132).
 Baladeva (Bala Rama ?) is mentioned as a Naga at (13,132).
 Bala Rama, the stepbrother of Vasudeva Krishna, is linked with Naga race, at (16,4).
 Bala Rama is linked with Sesha at (1,67).

Intermixing of other Indian races with Naga race
 Naga Nahusha is also mentioned as a king in the Lunar Dynasty of Arya Kings (3,178).
 A king named Riksha in the race of Puru (a branch of Lunar Dynasti is mentioned as marrying the daughter of a Naga in the race of Takshaka (1,95).
 Naga Aryaka is described as the grandfather of Kunti's father. Kunti is the mother of Pandavas. (1,128).
 Iravat was mentioned as the son of Arjuna and a Naga woman named Uloopi, born in the race of Airavata (6,91).
 Sage Somasrava, the priest of Janamejaya was the son of a Brahmin named Srutasrava and a Naga woman. (1,3).
 Sage Astika was the son of a sage in the race of Yayavara Brahmins (1,13) and a Naga woman (sister of Vasuki) (1-14,15,48). Though but a boy, he had great gravity and intelligence. And he was reared with great care in the palace of the Nagas (1,48). He prevented the massacre of the Naga race by Janamejaya (1-15,56).

Other references
 The Daitya heroes Sunda and Upasunda defeated the Devas, Yakshas, Rakshasas, Nagas and Arya kings. (1-212,214)
 Rakshasa king Ravana also defeated all of them (3,289).
 Naga women were mentioned to be very beautiful (3,263) (4,9) (6,105).
 In the Harivamsa, Karkotaka and his Nagas were mentioned to be vanquished by Kartavirya Arjuna, the thousand human armed Chandravanshi Yadava King of Haihayas.
 Yakshas, and Rakshasas, and Nagas were mentioned to use 17 types of crops for their food. This crops were mentioned as produced by a king named Prithu, the son of Vena (12,58).
 At (14,44) the word Uraga is used to denote all the reptile-species and the word Naga is used to denote all snakes, where it mentions Nagas are the foremost among the Uragas.

See also
List of Nagas
Lauhitya Kingdom
Tamil Naga tribes 
Nair
 Rajbhar
 Bhar
Garuda
 Kingdoms of Ancient India
 Mucalinda
 Nagas

References

 Mahabharata of Krishna Dwaipayana Vyasa, translated to English by Kisari Mohan Ganguli

Kingdoms in the Mahabharata
Himalayan kingdoms (Puranas)